Usama Khan (born 22 November 1991) is a Pakistani television actor. He made his debut in 2017 with a mirror role usama in Adhi Gawahi. Khan is best known for portraying the main role  Tabrez in 2018 soap Sanwari for which he received critical acclaim and earned Hum Award for Best Soap Actor. 

He further portraying main role in A-Plus TV's Bezuban and Hum TV's Main Khwab Bunti Hon. His other appearances in the same year include Bisaat e Dil (2019), Ghalati (2019),  Haqeeqat (2019). Khan is recently seen portraying pivotal role Affan in Momina Duraid's Dobara.

Life and career 
Khan was born and raised in Gujranwala. He did his schooling at St. Peter's High School. In 2011, he came to Lahore for ACCA. After completing ACCA from SKANS School of Accountancy, he worked  for Silk Bank, an audit firm and a corporate company. Since college days, he aspires to pursue a career in acting. In 2017, he made his acting debut with a supporting role in Urdu 1 series Mujhay Jeenay Do. In an interview, Khan said that director Angeline Malik helped him in getting a debut role and when he came to Karachi, she referred him to other television producers. He went on to play the supporting roles in PTV's Rasmain (2017), Hum TV's Bisaat-e-Dil (2018), TV One's Gori Ki Dukaan (2018) and episodic appearance in Ustani Jee.

He got his first lead role in Hum TV's Sanwari (2018) opposite Zainab Shabbir. Sanwari ran for 180 episodes and proved to be the breakthrough for him. It also earned him Hum Award for Best Soap Actor. He further played lead roles in Syed Atif Ali's directed Bezuban (2019) opposite Nawal Saeed and Adeel Qamar's directed Main Khwab Bunti Hon (2019) opposite Michelle Mumtaz. In addition to appearing as lead, he played a supporting role in the romantic drama Ghalati featuring Hira Mani and Affan Waheed in leads, family drama Tamanna opposite Haroon Shahid and Nausheen Ahmed and anthology series Dikhawa. Besides television, Khan appeared in brand TVC's including Silk Bank, Bold, Jazz and Nestle.

Khan played the Noriyan in Geo Entertainment's Uraan opposite Kinza Hashmi and Adeel Chaudhry which was produced by Abdullah Kadwani under 7th Sky Entertainment and Kaafur in Hum TV's horror series Chalawa produced by MD Productions and NJ Films.

Currently, he is playing Vicky in Geo Entertainment's Ramadan special Ishq Jalebi. Furthermore, he will also star in Hum TV's Sitam opposite Nawal Saeed, Moomal Khalid and Saad Qureshi produced by MD Productions and Gold Bridge Media and Geo Entertainment's Mohlat produced by 7th Sky Entertainment which will also feature Kinza Hashmi, Sami Khan, Komal Aziz Khan, Bushra Ansari and Asma Abbas.

Television

Special appearance

Awards and nominations

References 

Living people
1992 births
Pakistani male actors